The Diving Board Tour was a concert tour by British musician Elton John taking place in North, South and Central America and Europe in promotion of John's 2013 album The Diving Board.

Background
John will perform in fourteen cities in the United States before traveling to Europe to perform ten concerts in Europe in the Fall of 2013.

Tour dates

Cancellations and rescheduled shows

Setlist
"Funeral for a Friend/Love Lies Bleeding"
"Bennie and the Jets"
"Candle in the Wind"
"Grey Seal"
"Levon"
"Tiny Dancer"
"Holiday Inn"
"Mona Lisas and Mad Hatters"
"Believe"
"Philadelphia Freedom"
"Goodbye Yellow Brick Road"
"Rocket Man (I Think It's Going to Be a Long, Long Time)"
"Hey Ahab"
"I Guess That's Why They Call It the Blues"
"The One" (Solo)
"Oceans Away"
"Voyeur"
"Someone Saved My Life Tonight"
"Sad Songs (Say So Much)"
"All the Girls Love Alice"
"Home Again"
"Don't Let the Sun Go Down on Me"
"I'm Still Standing"
"The Bitch is Back"
"Your Sister Can't Twist (But She Can Rock and Roll)"
"Saturday Night's Alright for Fighting"
Encore
"Your Song"
"Crocodile Rock"

{{hidden
| headercss = background: #87CEEB; font-size: 100%; width: 50%;
| contentcss = text-align: left; font-size: 100%; width: 50%;
| header = 4 – 7 September 2013
| content =
"The Bitch is Back"
"Bennie and the Jets"
"Grey Seal"
"Levon"
"Tiny Dancer"
"Holiday Inn"
"Believe"
"Mona Lisas and Mad Hatters"
"Philadelphia Freedom"
"Candle in the Wind"
"Goodbye Yellow Brick Road"
"Rocket Man"
"Hey Ahab"
"I Guess That's Why they Call it the Blues"
"Funeral for a Friend/Love Lies Bleeding"
"Oscar Wilde Gets Out"
"Sad Songs (Say So Much)"
"Daniel"
"Sorry Seems to be the Hardest Word"
"The One"
"Don't Let the Sun Go Down on Me"
"I'm Still Standing"
"Crocodile Rock"
"Saturday Night's Alright for Fighting"
Encore
"Home Again"
"Your Song"
}}
{{hidden
| headercss = background: #87CEEB; font-size: 100%; width: 50%;
| contentcss = text-align: left; font-size: 100%; width: 50%;
| header = Bestival Setlist
| content =
"The Bitch Is Back"
"Benny and the Jets"
"Grey Seal"
"Levon"
"Tiny Dancer"
"Philadelphia Freedom"
"Goodbye Yellow Brick Road"
"Rocket Man"
"Hey Ahab"
"I Guess That's Why They Call It The Blues"
"Funeral for a Friend/Love Lies Bleeding"
"Candle in the Wind"
"Sad Songs (Say So Much)"
"Don't Let The Sun Go Down on Me"
"I'm Still Standing"
"Crocodile Rock"
"Saturday Night's Alright (For Fighting)"
Encore
"Home Again"
"Your Song"
}}
{{hidden
| headercss = background: #87CEEB; font-size: 100%; width: 50%;
| contentcss = text-align: left; font-size: 100%; width: 50%;
| header = iTunes Festival Setlist
| content =
"The Bitch Is Back"
"Benny and the Jets"
"Levon"
"Tiny Dancer"
"Can't Stay Alone Tonight"
"Philadelphia Freedom"
"Oscar Wilde Gets Out"
"Mexican Vacation (Kids in the Candlelight)"
"Goodbye Yellow Brick Road"
"Rocket Man"
"Hey Ahab"
"Sorry Seems to be the Hardest Word"
"Don't Let The Sun Go Down on Me"
"I'm Still Standing"
"Saturday Night's Alright (For Fighting)"
Encore
"Home Again"
"Your Song"
}}

Tour band
Elton John – Piano, vocals
Davey Johnstone – Guitar, banjo, backing vocals
Matt Bissonette – Bass guitar, backing vocals
Kim Bullard – keyboards
John Mahon – Percussion, backing vocals
Nigel Olsson – drums, backing vocals
Luka Šulić – Cello
Stjepan Hauser – Cello
Lisa Stone – Backing vocals
Rose Stone – Backing vocals
Tata Vega – Backing vocals
Jean Witherspoon – Backing vocals
Sources:

External links
Elton John's official website

References

Elton John concert tours
2013 concert tours
2014 concert tours